Chung Yoo-Suk  (born 25 October 1977) is a South Korea footballer. He played as a goalkeeper for Busan I'Park, Gwangju Sangmu (military service), National League side Gangneung City and Ulsan Hyundai.

Club career statistics

External links

 FIFA Player Statistics

1977 births
Living people
Association football goalkeepers
South Korean footballers
Busan IPark players
Gimcheon Sangmu FC players
Ulsan Hyundai FC players
K League 1 players
Korea National League players
Sportspeople from Ulsan